Dub Chablaigh ingen Cathal, Empress of the Irish, died 1009.

Background
Dubh Chablaigh was a daughter of King Cathal mac Conchobar mac Taidg of Connacht, who died in 1010. Her mother's identity is uncertain. Her brothers and half-brothers were Tadg in Eich Gil, Brian, Conchobor, In Cléirech, and Tadhg Díreach.

Marriage and issue
She was the fourth wife of Brian Boru and is thought to have been the mother of his son, Domnall, who died in 1010 or 1011. He was survived by a son, Diarmait, who died in 1051. Brian had three known daughters but it is unknown if Dub Chablaigh was the mother of any of them.

Title
Brian styled himself Emperor of the Irish in 1005 at Armagh, which is the origin of her title.

See also

 Dubhchobhlaigh

Family tree

     Cathal mac Conchobar mac Taidg, d. 1010.     
     |
     |__
     |                     |                            |          |             |                       |
     |                     |                            |          |             |                       |
     Dub Chablaigh   Tadg in Eich Gil, d. 1030.   Brian,     Conchobor,    In Cléirech, fl. 1044.  Tadhg Díreach
    =Brian Boru           =?                           d. 1029      fl. 1029.    |                       |
     |                     |                                                     |_              |
     |                     |                                                     |        |              An Gilla Lónach
     Domnall?              Áed in Gai Bernaig,                                   |        |
     |                      King of Connacht,                                    Tadg,    Conchobar,
     |                         died 1067.                                       d.1056.    d. 1069.
     Diarmait,              
     d. 1051.

References

 Early Irish kingship and succession, pp.314-315, Bart Jaski, 2000. 
 Leabhar na nGenealach, pp.484-85, p.614-15,  
 Medieval Ireland:An Encyclopeida, p.46, ed. Seán Duffy, Routledge, 2005. 
 Brian Boru:Ireland's greatest king?, pp.31-33, Máire Ní Mhaonaigh, Tempus, 2007. .

Irish royal consorts
11th-century Irish women
11th-century Irish people
People from County Galway
People from County Roscommon
Irish princesses